Robin Stanislaw Ligus (6 March 1952 – 16 December 2022) was a convicted English serial killer. In 1996, he was convicted of murdering Robert Young and jailed for life. In 2011, Ligus was charged with three additional murders, found guilty of two, and ordered to be detained indefinitely in a secure hospital, having suffered from the effects of a stroke.

Victims 
 Trevor Bradley (aged 53), found in a burned out car in Melverley.
 Brian Coles (aged 57), found in his home in Higher Heath, near Whitchurch, having been beaten to death with an iron bar.
 Robert Young (aged 75), killed in Shrewsbury during a burglary of his home.

Death
Ligus died on 16 December 2022 at the age of 70.

See also
 List of serial killers in the United Kingdom

References

1952 births
2022 deaths
English serial killers
Male serial killers
People from Shropshire
Violence against men in the United Kingdom